The Wednesbury Charity Cup was an early football competition held from 1880 - eight years before the foundation of the Football League - for teams from the West Midlands region of England. The competition was conceived and initiated by Isaak Griffiths, a businessman and magistrate from Wednesbury. Money raised from the competition went to local causes.

Trophy 

Winners were awarded a solid silver trophy, on which the name of each year's winning team was engraved. The cup was made by Walker and Hall of Birmingham and hallmarked in 1879, and is topped by a figure of Charity It cost £100, paid for by public subscription.

In 2016, a member of the public offered the trophy, in poor condition, to Bowjangles, a jewellery shop in Wednesbury, for scrap. Bowjanges owner Aaron Sheldon recognised its provenance and arranged for the trophy to be restored by Crescent Silver in Birmingham's Jewellery Quarter, a process which took five months. The newly-restored trophy was sold at auction by Cuttlestones Auctioneers and Valuers of Wolverhampton, on 2 December 2016, for £7,250.

The first name engraved on the trophy is "Stafford Road, Wolverhampton 1880" and the last "Cradley Town 1991".

Winners

References

Defunct football cup competitions in England
Wednesbury
English football trophies and awards
Awards established in 1880